Rock Creek is an unincorporated community in Rock Creek Township, Jefferson County, Kansas, United States.  It lies along 110th Road near its intersection with K-4.  K-4 used to run along Rock Creek Road and originally cut through Rock Creek, but years later the highway was widened and rebuilt just east of Rock Creek.

History
Rock Creek had a post office from the 1870s until 1959.

Geography
The community is located at  (39.2458313, -95.5371988), at an elevation of 1,099 feet (335 m).

Education
The community is served by Jefferson West USD 340 public school district.

References

Further reading

External links
 Jefferson County maps: Current, Historic, KDOT

Unincorporated communities in Kansas
Unincorporated communities in Jefferson County, Kansas